Aforia moskalevi is a species of sea snail, a marine gastropod mollusk in the family Cochlespiridae.

Description
The length of the shell attains 33.4 mm, its diameter 12.2 mm.

Distribution
This species occurs in the southwest Pacific Ocean.

References

 Sysoev & Kantor, Deep-sea gastropods of the genus Aforia (Turridae)  of the Pacific: Species composition, Systematics, and functional morphology of the digerstive system; The Veliger, California Malacozoological Society Northern California Malacozoological Club v.30 (1987-1988)

External links
 BioLib: Aforia moskalevi

moskalevi
Gastropods described in 1987